Michael Paul Perez (born March 7, 1963) is a former American football quarterback. He was drafted by the New York Giants in the seventh round of the 1988 NFL Draft. Perez played college football at San Jose State and has also been a member of the Houston Oilers, Frankfurt Galaxy, Kansas City Chiefs, Denver Broncos, Albany Firebirds, New York CityHawks and New England Sea Wolves.

Early life and college
Born and raised in Denver, Perez graduated from Denver South High School in 1983 and attended Taft Junior College in California. In 1985, Perez transferred to San Jose State University. He became starting quarterback in 1986 after redshirting the 1985 season. Perez led the Spartans to the Pacific Coast Athletic Association conference championship and briefly garnered national media attention.

Professional career

New York Giants
Perez was selected by the New York Giants in the seventh round (175th overall) of the 1988 NFL Draft. On injured reserve with pulled stomach muscle (September 19, 1988-remainder of season). He was released by the team on August 23, 1989.

Houston Oilers
Perez was signed by the Houston Oilers on May 14, 1990. He was released on August 6.

Frankfurt Galaxy
Perez signed with the World League of American Football on January 31, 1991. He was selected by the Frankfurt Galaxy in the first round (third quarterback) of the 1991 WLAF positional draft.

Perez was the starting quarterback in all ten regular season games, completing 171 of 357 passes for 2,272 yards and 13 touchdowns. He also rushed 44 times for 189 yards, resulting in a team-leading 4.3 average. Perez suffered only 19 sacks (2nd lowest in the World League) for 115 negative yards and was intercepted 17 times. His best games were at New York/New Jersey where he threw for three touchdowns with a 61 percent completion rate, and at Orlando, where he passed for 346 yards including a 59-yard hurl to Jason Johnson.

Perez was also the leading passer for Frankfurt in 1992.

Denver Broncos
Perez was signed by the Denver Broncos on April 28, 1993. He was released on August 30.

Arena Football
From 1994-1996 Perez played for the Albany Firebirds, leading the league in touchdowns each year, and earning 2nd team All-Arena honors all three seasons. In 1997 and 1998 he played for the New York CityHawks, as well as in 1999 when the team moved and became the New England Sea Wolves.

Life after football
Perez currently works in Finance as a Loan Officer at Megastar Financial Corp.  Perez is active in the Denver community and serves as Chair of the Board of Environmental Learning for Kids.

See also
 List of NCAA major college football yearly passing leaders
 List of NCAA major college football yearly total offense leaders

References

External links
"Coulda, Woulda, Shoulda", by Eric Dexheimer.  January 6, 2000 
"Passing Marks..." by Richard Hoffer.  Los Angeles Times, November 12, 1987

1963 births
Living people
Players of American football from Denver
American football quarterbacks
San Jose State Spartans football players
New York Giants players
Houston Oilers players
Frankfurt Galaxy players
Kansas City Chiefs players
Denver Broncos players
Albany Firebirds players
New York CityHawks players
New England Sea Wolves players
Taft Cougars football players
American sportspeople of Mexican descent